Agbarha Otor (Agbarha-Otor)  is a town and one of the Urhobo kingdoms in Ughelli North Local Government Area of Delta State. The town is home to the famous Ibru family. Besides private and public primary and secondary schools, Agbarha-Otor has a private university, namely Michael and Cecilia Ibru University. It also has the 222 Battalion of the Nigerian Army and the now moribund SuperBru, a malt producing company.

Villages in Agbara-Otor 

 Agbaide	
 Agbarha-Otor
 Aghalokpe
 Awirha
 Edjeba
 Edjekemevor	
 Edoide	
 Ehwahwa
 Esemagidi	
 Etefe	
 Gana
 Idjerhe	
 Ihwredju	
 Imiroje
 Oghara	
 Ogorode	
 Okpara
 Omakoghwre
 Omavovwe
 Ophori
 Oteri
 Otokutu	
 Owevwe	
 Saniko	
 Ujovwre

References

Populated places in Delta State